Qalatak (also Romanized as Qalātak; also known as Rūbanī) is a village in Mashayekh Rural District, Doshman Ziari District, Mamasani County, Fars Province, Iran. At the 2006 census, its population was 349, in 88 families.

References 

Populated places in Mamasani County